The Embassy of the Democratic Republic of the Congo in London is the diplomatic mission of the Democratic Republic of the Congo in the United Kingdom. The embassy was formerly located on Grays Inn Road in Kings Cross.

In 2011, a protest was held outside the embassy by the Congolese International Rights group, alleging irregularities in the 2011 Congolese election.

References

External links
Official site

Democratic Republic of the Congo
Diplomatic missions of the Democratic Republic of the Congo
Democratic Republic of the Congo–United Kingdom relations
Buildings and structures in the City of Westminster
Great Portland Street
Fitzrovia